Leonard Josiah Maxwell (17 March 1906 – 31 January 1982) was an Australian rules footballer who played with Hawthorn in the Victorian Football League (VFL).

Notes

External links 

1906 births
1982 deaths
Australian rules footballers from Victoria (Australia)
Hawthorn Football Club players